W/ Bob & David is a comedy sketch show created by and starring Bob Odenkirk and David Cross that premiered on Netflix on November 13, 2015. The sketch show consists of four half-hour episodes plus an hour-long making-of special entitled "Behind the Making of the Scenes". It is a revival of sorts of the 1995-1998 HBO sketch comedy series Mr. Show with Bob and David, which also starred Odenkirk and Cross. W/ Bob & David shares many of the same supporting cast members and writing team of the earlier series, and its title is also a variation of that of Mr. Show. Odenkirk described  W/ Bob & David as "lighter", "less complex" and "faster" than Mr. Show.

Production 
Shooting began on April 15, 2015. W/ Bob & David is written and executive produced by Odenkirk and Cross. Marc Provissiero and Naomi Odenkirk, Tim Sarkes, Dave Kneebone, Tim Heidecker, and Eric Wareheim also produce. The four episodes, which were released simultaneously on November 13, 2015, had the studio segments directed by Keith Truesdell and the pre-recorded segments directed by Jason Woliner, except for the fourth episode, in which Tom Gianas also directed the pre-recorded segments. The hour-long making of special was directed by Lance Bangs.

The opening title sequence was created by digital artist and musician Cyriak Harris. Bob & David contacted Cyriak to create the opening sequence with a hands-off approach, only asking him to not make it specifically like standard TV credits but more like his viral YouTube videos. His signature style of beat sequenced animations to original music compositions featuring morphing branches of elements from still photos and videos created in Adobe After Effects.  is greatly inspired by, and has been compared to Terry Gilliam's animated sequences used in the British sketch comedy show, Monty Python's Flying Circus, a significant inspiration for the show's creators and it's featured crossing of sketches with transitional videos and animated elements. 
The series is dedicated to Andrew McBell. McBell Was a supporter of David Cross during his time on Mr. Show. McBell died during the September 11th Attacks, 14 years prior to the shows release.

Episodes

Cast 

 Bob Odenkirk
 David Cross

 John Ennis 
 Jay Johnston 
 Tom Kenny 
 Brett Paesel 
 Brian Posehn 
 Jill Talley 
 Paul F. Tompkins 
 Mark Rivers 
 Scott Aukerman 
 Eric Von Hoffman 
 Mary Lynn Rajskub 
 Dino Stamatopoulos 
 Becky Thyre 

 Scott Adsit
 Dave Allen
 Stephanie Courtney
 Paget Brewster
 Mike Mitchell
 Keegan-Michael Key
 Jeffrey Tambor
 Joe Frank

Reception
W/ Bob & David received positive reviews from critics. On the review aggregator website Rotten Tomatoes, the series holds an approval rating of 89%, based on 27 reviews, with an average rating of 7.64/10. The site's critical consensus reads, "W/ Bob & David offers a long-overdue reunion between Mr. Show principals Odenkirk and Cross – and a suitably hilarious reminder of the reasons for their subsequent individual successes." On Metacritic, the series has a score of 76 out of 100, based on 20 critics, indicating "generally favorable reviews".

In June 2020, Netflix removed the third episode of the show, due to a segment in which Cross's character wears blackface. Both he and Odenkirk objected to the decision, with Cross saying the scene was meant to satirize the character's "ridiculous foolish[ness]".

Future

In an August 2016 interview with The A.V. Club, Cross stated "We will absolutely do some more of that at some point. It's really tough. Bob and I really want to do it, Netflix would like us to do it again, everybody's on board. It's just a matter of scheduling, and Bob's got a very strict, specific schedule with Better Call Saul."

In an August 2022 interview on the podcast Comedy Bang! Bang!, Odenkirk stated that it was unlikely there would be another season of the show, citing the age of the cast.

References

External links
 
 

English-language Netflix original programming
Television series by Abso Lutely Productions
2015 American television series debuts
2015 American television series endings
2010s American sketch comedy television series